Hauskyjza (Silesian: home cheese from the German Hauskäse) is a foodstuff made of cottage cheese, carum and other ingredients, which are mixed, put aside for a few days to acquire the characteristic sharp flavor, scent and tacky consistency, and then warmed and fried. Often baking soda is used to condition the cottage cheese. Hauskyjza or Ser Smazony (fried cheese)  or Ser Zgliwiały ( rottened cheese) is a traditional product in Wielkopolska, Pomorze,  Kujawy and Silesia. Before refrigerators were widely available, it was valued because of its high fastness.

Haukyjza has an exceptionally strong scent and flavor, pleasurable to many aficionados, but found offensive by some people. (In numerous Silesian jokes, the flavor is compared to that of long-unwashed socks.)  Most traditionally, it is served with dark bread and carway or with "music," chopped onions soaked in vinegar and oil. Some people prefer it freshly made as a type of fondue.

Hauskyjza has been traditionally made at home, hence the name. Currently, it is also produced commercially.

In 2005, it was registered on a List of Traditional Products (pol. Lista Produktów Tradycyjnych) of Ministry of Agriculture and Rural Development as Ser domowy smażony z kminkiem, z czosnkiem, bez przypraw (home-made fried cheese with carum, with garlic, without spices).

References 

Polish cuisine
Cheese dishes